Orville Ernest Mohler (May 29, 1909 – November 26, 1949), sometimes referred to as Orv Mohler, was an American football and baseball player.  He grew up in Alhambra, California, and attended the University of Southern California (USC). His father was a second baseman in the Pacific Coast League.  While attending USC, the younger Mohler was the student council president, played baseball and played at the quarterback position for the USC Trojans football team.  He led the 1931 USC Trojans football team to a national championship and a victory in the 1932 Rose Bowl, and, at the end of the 1931 season, he was selected by the Central Press Association as a second-team All-American fullback and by the Associated Press as a third-team All-American quarterback.  In 1933, after graduating from USC, Mohler played professional baseball in the Pacific Coast League for the Mission Reds. He was married in 1933 to Bernadine Olson. He died in the crash of an Air Force plane in 1949 and was posthumously inducted into the USC Hall of Fame in 1995. He was buried at the Forest Lawn Memorial Park in Glendale, California.

References

External links
 
 

1909 births
1949 deaths
American football fullbacks
American football quarterbacks
Baseball shortstops
Los Angeles Angels (minor league) players
Mission Reds players
USC Trojans baseball players
USC Trojans football players
Sportspeople from Alhambra, California
Baseball players from California
Players of American football from California